Louis William, Margrave of Baden-Baden (8 April 1655 – 4 January 1707) was the ruling Margrave of Baden-Baden in Germany and chief commander of the Imperial army. He was also known as Türkenlouis ("Turkish Louis") for his numerous victories against Ottoman forces. After his death in 1707, his wife, Sibylle of Saxe-Lauenburg, acted as regent of Baden-Baden during the minority of his eldest son, who succeeded him as Margrave of Baden-Baden.

Family

Born in Paris, Louis was a son of Hereditary Prince Ferdinand Maximilian of Baden-Baden and his French wife, Louise of Savoy. His godfather was Louis XIV of France. His father was the elder son of Wilhelm, Margrave of Baden-Baden, whom he pre-deceased, leaving Louis to succeed as reigning Margrave of Baden-Baden and head of the Catholic branch of the House of Zähringen.

His mother's brother was the Count of Soissons, father of the renowned general Prince Eugene of Savoy, whose military career would start in the shadow of Louis, Eugene being Louis's junior; the cousins would serve together the Holy Roman Emperor against the French in several campaigns. His parents being estranged, he was kidnapped as a child from his mother's home in Paris and re-patriated to Germany, where he was raised by his paternal step-grandmother.

Military career

Louis William served first under Raimondo Montecuccoli against Turenne, and then under the duke of Lorraine. At the siege of Vienna by the Turks, in 1683, he threw his forces into the city, and by a brilliant sally effected a junction with Jan III Sobieski and the Duke of Lorraine, who had come to its relief. In 1689 he defeated the Turks at Niš.

Louis came to be called the Türkenlouis or shield of the empire. The Turks called him the red king, because his red uniform jacket made him very visible on the battlefield. He was known as a defender of Europe against the Turks, as was Eugene of Savoy.
As a military commander in the service of the Holy Roman Empire, in 1689 he was made chief commander of the Imperial army in Hungary, where he scored a resounding victory against the Ottomans at Slankamen in 1691. Louis saw Osijek as a location of exceptional strategic importance in the war against the Ottomans. He urged the repair of the city walls, and proposed construction of a new fort called Tvrđa, according to Vauban's principles of military engineering. Shortly afterward he was sent to head the army of the Rhine in the War of the Grand Alliance.

In 1701, he built the Lines of Stollhofen, a line of defensive earthworks designed to protect northern Baden from French attack. He later led the imperial army in the War of the Spanish Succession where he successfully concluded the Siege of Landau in September 1702, but soon had to withdraw across the Rhine and was defeated by the French under the Duke of Villars at Friedlingen. In 1704 however, he participated in the successful German campaign of Marlborough and Eugene of Savoy. He distinguished himself in the Battle of Schellenberg and besieged and conquered Ingolstadt and Landau, thus drawing Bavarian troops away from the decisive Battle of Blenheim.

.
At the Battle of Schellenberg in July 1704, Ludwig Wilhelm had suffered a wound that did not fully heal. He continued to command on the Upper Rhine without treating the injury and died as a result of this wound on January 4, 1707 at the age of 51 in his unfinished Schloss Rastatt. In his painting "The Last Hours of Louis William" the German-Greek painter Aris Kalaizis immortalized the end of the life of the commander. His wife took up a regency for their son, Louis George. The latter took over the government from his mother in October 1727.

Marriage and children
The Emperor gave him a young heiress to wed, Sibylle of Saxe-Lauenburg.  They had the following children:
Leopold William of Baden-Baden (1694 – 1695) Hereditary Prince of Baden-Baden, died in infancy;
Charlotte of Baden-Baden (1696 – 1700) died in infancy;
Charles Joseph of Baden-Baden (1697 – 1703) Hereditary Prince of Baden-Baden, died young;
Wilhelmine of Baden-Baden (1700 in Schlackenwerth – 1702 in Schlackenwerth), died in infancy;
Luise of Baden-Baden (1701 in Nürnberg – 1707), died young;
Louis George Simpert of Baden-Baden, (7 June 1702 – 22 October 1761) Margrave of Baden-Baden, married Maria Anna of Schwarzenberg, had children; married again to Maria Anna of Bavaria, no children;
Wilhelm Georg Simpert of Baden-Baden (1703 – 1709), died young;
Auguste of Baden-Baden, (10 November 1704 in Aschaffenburg – 8 August 1726 in Paris) married Louis d'Orléans, Duke of Orléans and had children.
Augustus George Simpert of Baden-Baden, (14 January 1706 – 21 October 1771) Margrave of Baden-Baden, married Marie Victoire d'Arenberg, no male children.

Seventeen years after the margrave's death, the only one of his daughters to survive childhood, Princess Auguste, married Louis d'Orléans, son of the infamous French Regent and, at the time of the wedding, first in the line of succession to the throne of France.

His descendant through this marriage became King Louis Philippe of the French in 1830.

After the death of Louis, his widow built Schloss Favorite castle as a summer residence in memory of her husband. He was buried at the Stiftskirche in Baden-Baden.

Ancestry

References

External links
 

1655 births
1707 deaths
House of Zähringen
Nobility from Paris
Roman Catholic monarchs
Candidates for the Polish elective throne
Hereditary Princes of Baden-Baden
Margraves of Baden-Baden
German army commanders in the War of the Spanish Succession
German military personnel of the Nine Years' War
Knights of the Golden Fleece
People of the Great Turkish War
Field marshals of the Holy Roman Empire
Soldiers of the Imperial Circles
Burials at Stiftskirche, Baden-Baden
Military personnel of the Franco-Dutch War